Eurotrash may refer to:

 Eurotrash (term), derogatory term used for certain Europeans, especially in the United States
 Eurotrash (album), 2001 album of Norwegian industrial rock band Zeromancer
 Eurotrash (TV series), late-night British comedy series from 1993 to 2007
 "Eurotrash", 1994 short story by Irvine Welsh in the collection The Acid House
 "Eurotrash", 1997 song by Celtic punk band Dropkick Murphys on Boys on the Docks
 "Eurotrash", 2021 novel by Christian Kracht

See also
Trailer trash
White trash